Exoribonuclease H is an enzyme. This enzyme catalyses the following chemical reaction

 3'-end directed exonucleolytic cleavage of viral RNA-DNA hybrid

This is a secondary reaction to the RNA 5'-end directed cleavage 13-19 nucleotides from the RNA end performed by EC 3.1.26.13 (retroviral ribonuclease H).

References

External links 
 

EC 3.1.13